The 7th Senate district of Wisconsin is one of 33 districts in the Wisconsin State Senate.  Located in southeast Wisconsin, the district comprises eastern and southeastern Milwaukee County, including downtown, south side, and lakeshore areas of the city of Milwaukee, as well as the cities of Cudahy, Oak Creek, South Milwaukee, and St. Francis, and part of the city of Franklin.  The district also contains the University of Wisconsin–Milwaukee campus, the Milwaukee Art Museum (Quadracci Pavilion), the Port of Milwaukee, Milwaukee Mitchell International Airport, and the Henry Maier Festival Park, site of Milwaukee's annual Summerfest.

Current elected officials
Chris Larson is the senator representing the 7th district.  He was first elected in the 2010 general election, after defeating incumbent Jeffrey Plale in a primary challenge.

Each Wisconsin State Senate district is composed of three State Assembly districts.  The 7th Senate district comprises the 19th, 20th, and 21st Assembly districts.  The current representatives of those districts are: 
 Assembly District 19: Ryan Clancy (D–Milwaukee)
 Assembly District 20: Christine Sinicki (D–Milwaukee)
 Assembly District 21: Jessie Rodriguez (R–Franklin)

The district is located within Wisconsin's 4th congressional district, which is represented by U.S. Representative Gwen Moore.

Past senators

A list of all previous senators from this district:

Note: the boundaries of districts have changed repeatedly over history. Previous politicians of a specific numbered district have represented a completely different geographic area, due to redistricting.

See also
Political subdivisions of Wisconsin

Notes

External links
Chris Larson official campaign site

Wisconsin State Senate districts
Milwaukee County, Wisconsin
1848 establishments in Wisconsin